Franca Helg (21 February 1920 Milan – 4 June 1989 Milan) was an Italian designer and architect. She also had a career teaching at Istituto Universitario Architettura Venezia and Polytechnic of Milan. She collaborated with Franco Albini from 1945 through 1977.

Biography 
Graduated from the Politecnico di Milano in 1945, Franca Helg was active both in the field of architectural planning and in industrial design, with important project interventions often in collaboration with Franco Albini, with whom she was for long associated professionally, from 1951 until the death of Albini in 1977. Subsequent to which she worked with Marco Albini and Antonio Piva.

After having been assistant to the seat of architectural composition held by Lodovico Barbiano di Belgiojoso first at the Istituto Universitario di Architettura di Venezia (Iuav) and then at then at the Politecnico di Milano, there followed associate teaching in 1967, teaching the same discipline, in which she became tenured in 1984.

Among her works, the Roman stores La Rinascente, in Piazza Fiume, the Terme Luigi Zoja of Salsomaggiore, the Museo degli Eremitani in Padova.

Awards 

 1964 Compasso d'Oro: Awarded to Franco Albini, Bob Noorda, and Franca Helg for the signage, graphic design, and interior design of the Milan underground.

Works 

 designed furniture and houseware for Poggi, Bonacina, and San Lorenzo
 (with Franco Albini)
 Restoration of the Burial Monument of Margherita di Lussemburgo
 Design of the interiors of the Museo del Tesoro della Cattedrale di San Lorenzo
 Furnishings of the Metropolitana di Milano (Compasso d'oro prize 1964)
 Olivetti store in Paris
 The neighborhood of Piccapietra in Genova
 Completion of the Museo di Sant'Agostino, annexed to the Chiesa di Sant'Agostino in Genova (1956-1986)
 Casa Zambelli in Forlì
 Palazzo La Rinascente a Roma (regional prize IN/ARCH for Lazio 1963)
 Molino Dorino station of the Metropolitana di Milano (1980-1985)
 Museo degli Eremitani in the convent complex annexed to the church by the same name (1982-1985)
 designed furniture with and without Franco Albini

References

External links 

 Helg (hèlġ), Franca, Enciclopedie on line,  from the site of the Enciclopedia Italiana Treccani 
 Franca Helg, da Scienza A Due Voci, women in Italian science from the Settecento to the Novecento (Università di Bologna) 
 
 
 

Italian designers
1989 deaths
1920 births
Olivetti people
Compasso d'Oro Award recipients
Italian women architects
Architects from Milan
Polytechnic University of Milan alumni